Highway 326 (AR 326, Ark. 326, and Hwy. 326) is a designation for two state highways in Pope County. A second route of  begins at Highway 124 and runs east to Highway 105. All routes are maintained by the Arkansas State Highway and Transportation Department (AHTD).

Route description

Western section
The route begins at AR 7 at the intersection with AR 7 Truck in south Russellville. Highway 326 runs west past the Confederate Mothers Memorial Park and the Mountain View School to Lake Dardanelle State Park, and continues north along the shore of Lake Dardanelle. The route concurs briefly with U.S. Route 64 near Washburn Park, after which it runs east to meet Highway 7, where the western section terminates.

Eastern section
The eastern section of Highway 326 begins at Highway 124 near the community of Gum Log and runs east to Highway 105, where the highway terminates. This segment of Highway 326 does not cross or concur with any other highways.

History
Highway 326 was first created by the Arkansas State Highway Commission on June 23, 1965 between US 64 and Skyline Drive in Russellville. A second route was created on October 27, 1965 between US 64 and Highway 124, as it exists today. In 1973, the Arkansas General Assembly passed Act 9 of 1973. As a result of this legislation, a third segment of Highway 326 was designated on May 23, 1973 between Gum Log and Highway 105.

The segment in Russellville was extended on May 23, 1979 between US 64 and Highway 7. The ASHC adopted a United States Army Corps of Engineers levee road constructed along the Illinois Bayou arm of Lake Dardanelle into the state highway system. Highway 326 was extended south from Skyline Drive to its present southern terminus on August 13, 1980.

Formerly, there was a third middle section of  along Weir Road, beginning at U.S. Highway 64 (US 64) in Russellville and running north to Highway 124 (AR 124). That section is now part of AR 124.

Major intersections
Mile markers reset at concurrencies.

See also

 List of state highways in Arkansas

References

External links

326
Transportation in Pope County, Arkansas